Marylands is a 3.7 hectare Local Nature Reserve in Hockley in Essex. It is owned by Rochford District Council and managed by Hockley Parish Council.

The site has a varied fauna and flora, with 96 species of trees, shrubs, grasses and herbs, and 13 of butterflies. Nine of the tree species are associated with ancient woodland. There are woodland and farmland birds, and a stream with sticklebacks.

The site is near Plumberow Road and there is full public access.

See also 
Hockley Woods

References

Local Nature Reserves in Essex